The Honda NSS250 or Reflex (US), Forza (International) is a  Honda maxi-scooter produced between 2001 and 2008.

References
The Complete Idiot's Guide to Scooters p 174.
 Scooters: Red Eyes, Whitewalls and Blue Smoke By Colin Shattuck, Eric Peterson. p 46
 HONDA REFLEX (NSS250)

NSS250
Motor scooters